Mathias Hain (born 31 December 1972) is a German former professional footballer who played as a goalkeeper. He is the brother of Uwe Hain, himself a former goalkeeper. Hain was known for his great shot stopping ability and, during his time at Arminia Bielefeld, captained the side until he left in 2008. He currently works as a goalkeeping coach for his final club as a player - Hamburg based FC St. Pauli.

References

External links
 

1972 births
Living people
People from Goslar
Footballers from Lower Saxony
German footballers
Association football goalkeepers
Eintracht Braunschweig players
SpVgg Greuther Fürth players
Arminia Bielefeld players
Bundesliga players
2. Bundesliga players
FC St. Pauli players
FC St. Pauli non-playing staff
Association football goalkeeping coaches